Thomas Hörster (born 27 November 1956) is a German retired footballer who played as a defender.

Club career
Born in Essen, Hörster spent his first three seasons as a professional with local Schwarz-Weiß Essen, in the second division. For 1977–78 he signed with another club in the league, Bayer 04 Leverkusen.

After winning promotion to the Bundesliga in 1979, Hörster was an essential defensive unit for Bayer in the following 13 seasons, his lowest input being 24 games in the 1981–82 campaign. In 1987–88 he appeared in a total of 35 official matches, including nine in the team's victorious run in the UEFA Cup – one goal against FK Austria Wien in a 5–1 home win (also the aggregate score)– even though he did not appear in any of the two matches of the final against RCD Español.

Hörster retired in June 1991 at the age of 34, with top flight totals of 332 games and 16 goals. He remained closely associated with Leverkusen in the following years, working as manager (youth teams, reserves, caretaker) and scout. On 16 February 2003, he was appointed main squad manager, leaving his position on 12 May.

International career
Hörster won four caps for West Germany, his debut coming on 24 September 1986 in a 2–0 friendly win in Denmark. All of his three other appearances were also in exhibition games.

Hörster was part of the West Germany Olympic team at the 1988 Summer Olympics in Seoul, helping the side win the bronze medal.

Honours

Player
Bayer Leverkusen
2. Bundesliga Nord: 1978–79
UEFA Cup: 1987–88

References

External links
 
 
 
 
 

1956 births
Living people
Footballers from Essen
German footballers
Association football defenders
Bundesliga players
2. Bundesliga players
Bayer 04 Leverkusen players
UEFA Cup winning players
Germany international footballers
Olympic footballers of West Germany
West German footballers
Footballers at the 1988 Summer Olympics
Olympic bronze medalists for West Germany
Olympic medalists in football
German football managers
Bundesliga managers
Bayer 04 Leverkusen managers
Medalists at the 1988 Summer Olympics